The theoretical strength of a solid is the maximum possible stress a perfect solid can withstand. It is often much higher than what current real materials can achieve. The lowered fracture stress is due to defects, such as interior or surface cracks. One of the goals for the study of mechanical properties of materials is to design and fabricate materials exhibiting strength close to the theoretical limit.

Definition 
When a solid is in tension, its atomic bonds stretch, elastically. Once a critical strain is reached, all the atomic bonds on the fracture plane rupture and the material fails mechanically. After fracture, the stretched atomic bonds return to their initial state, except that two surfaces have formed.

The theoretical strength is often approximated as:  

where 
 is the maximum theoretical stress the solid can withstand.
 E is the Young's Modulus of the solid.

Derivation 
The stress-displacement, or  vs x, relationship during fracture can be approximated by a sine curve, up to /4. The initial slope of the  vs x curve can be related to Young's modulus through the following relationship:

where 
 is the stress applied.
 E is the Young's Modulus of the solid.
  is the strain experienced by the solid.
 x is the displacement.

The strain derivative is therefore given by 

The relationship of initial slope of the  vs x curve with Young's modulus thus becomes 

The sinusoidal relationship of stress and displacement gives a derivative:

By setting the two  together, the theoretical strength becomes:

The theoretical strength can also be approximated using the fracture work per unit area, which result in slightly different numbers. However, the above derivation and final approximation is a commonly used metric for evaluating the advantages of a material's mechanical properties.

See also 
 Strength of materials
 Fracture mechanics
 Solid mechanics
 Stress (mechanics)
 Ultimate tensile strength
 Fracture
 Creep (deformation)
 Material Failure Theory

References 

Solid mechanics
Materials science